Gin Gang-hwan (born 7 January 1917) was a South Korean athlete. He competed in the men's hammer throw at the 1948 Summer Olympics.

References

External links
 

1917 births
Year of death missing
Athletes (track and field) at the 1948 Summer Olympics
South Korean male hammer throwers
Olympic athletes of South Korea
Place of birth missing
20th-century South Korean people